This is a list of presidential trips made by Donald Trump during 2018, the second year of his presidency as the 45th president of the United States.

This list excludes trips made within Washington, D.C., the U.S. federal capital in which the White House, the official residence and principal workplace of the president, is located. Also excluded are trips to Camp David, the country residence of the president. International trips are included. Here are the number of visits per state or territory he traveled to:
 One: Arizona, Guam, Hawaii, Kansas, Kentucky, Michigan, New Hampshire, and South Dakota
 Two: California, Illinois, Iowa, Minnesota, Mississippi, North Dakota, South Carolina and Wisconsin
 Three: Georgia, Nevada and Texas
 Four: Montana, New York, North Carolina and Tennessee
 Five: Indiana 
 Six: Missouri and West Virginia
 Seven: Maryland and Ohio
 Eight: New Jersey and Pennsylvania
 Fourteen: Florida 
 Twenty-six: Virginia

January

February

March

April

May

June

July

August

September

October

November

December

See also 
 List of international presidential trips made by Donald Trump
 List of post–2016 election Donald Trump rallies
 List of presidential trips made by Donald Trump

References 

2018 in American politics
2018 in international relations
2018-related lists
Lists of events in the United States
Trips, domestic